Haseltonia may be:

 a synonym of Cephalocereus, a genus of cacti
 the title of the technical yearbook of the Cactus and Succulent Society of America